Gwoździec may refer to the following places:

 Gwoździec, Lesser Poland Voivodeship, a village in southern Poland
 Gwoździec, Podkarpackie Voivodeship, a village in southeastern Poland
 Hvizdets, a town in western Ukraine